The 2016 IFA Shield (officially known as the LG IFA Shield 2016 for sponsorship reasons) was the 120th edition of the IFA Shield. The tournament is designed as a U19 youth football tournament since 2015.

This year ten football clubs going to participate including two overseas football clubs. The winners of LG IFA Shield was awarded with an amount of  5 Lakhs, while the second seeded team will get an amount of  3 Lakhs.

The tournament was managed by Ekalavya Sports Foundation, run by former international Kalyan Chaubey and other TFA graduates.

Tata Football Academy became the champions of the tournament by beating AIFF Elite Academy on 6 March 2016 which was played at Mohun Bagan Ground. The score was even 2–2 during the regulation time. After extra time match ended 3–2 in the favour of Tata Football Academy. Shubham Ghosh was awarded the man of the match and Baoringdao Bodo player of the tournament.

Venue
Most of the matches were held at East Bengal Ground and Mohun Bagan Ground while Kalyani Stadium and Barasat Stadium were the other venues.

Qualifying round
Four teams played in knockout format. The winner of the knockouts qualified for the final phase of the tournament.

* Tata Football Academy qualified for final phase of 2016 IFA U19 Shield.

Final phase
All times are Indian Standard Time (IST) – UTC+05:30.

Group A

Fixtures and Results

Group B

Fixtures and Results

Knockouts

Semi-finals

Semi-final 1

Semi-final 2

Final

Statistics

Top scorers

External links
 IFA Shield Results – Goal.com
 IFA Shield U-19 2016 – Thif-Live.com
 IFA Shield U-19 2016 – KolkataFootball.com
 IFA Shield U-19 Section – KolkataSports.com

References

IFA Shield seasons
Ifa Shield
Ifa Shield